Alexis Rubalcaba (born September 9, 1972) is a retired boxer from Cuba, who competed in the Super Heavyweight division. He twice represented his native country at the Summer Olympics: in 1996 (where he suffered a shocking loss to Paea Wolfgramm of Tonga in the quarter-finals) and in 2000. One of his biggest achievements in amateur boxing was winning the gold medal at the 1999 Pan American Games in Winnipeg, Manitoba, Canada. Two years earlier, at the 1997 World Amateur Boxing Championships in Budapest, Hungary, he won a silver medal.

Results 
1996 Summer Olympics
1st round bye
Defeated Paolo Vidoz (Italy) RSC 1 (2:39)
Lost to Paea Wolfgramm (Tonga) 12-17

1999 Pan American Games
Defeated Ruben Pallardel (Peru) KO 1
Defeated Patrice L'Heureux (Canada) RSC 2
Defeated Claudio Silva (Brazil) RSCH 1
Defeated Davin King (United States) WO.

2000 Summer Olympics
Defeated Cengiz Koc (Germany) KO 1
Lost to Mukhtarkhan Dildabekov (Kazakhstan) 12-25

References
Amateur record ( ( 2009-10-25)

1972 births
Living people
Heavyweight boxers
Super-heavyweight boxers
Boxers at the 1996 Summer Olympics
Boxers at the 1999 Pan American Games
Boxers at the 2000 Summer Olympics
Olympic boxers of Cuba
Cuban male boxers
AIBA World Boxing Championships medalists
Pan American Games gold medalists for Cuba
Pan American Games medalists in boxing
Medalists at the 1999 Pan American Games